"Too Turned On" is a single by American freestyle and dance-pop singer Alisha. It was released as the second single from her debut studio album Alisha and became another club hit for her in 1985.

Chart performance
"Too Turned On" peaked at No. 6 on the Billboard Dance Club Songs chart, staying on the chart for 11 weeks.

References

1985 songs
Vanguard Records singles
1985 singles